Shouka may refer to:
 Shouka (album), an album by Mariem Hassan
 Shouka (mountain pass), a mountain pass in southern Taiwan